A hieromonk (Slavonic: Иеромонахъ), also called a priestmonk, is a monk who is also a priest in the Eastern Orthodox Church and Eastern Catholicism.

A hieromonk can be either a monk who has been ordained to the priesthood or a priest who has received monastic tonsure. When a married priest's wife dies, it is not uncommon for him to become a monk, since the Church forbids clergy to enter into a second marriage after ordination.

Ordination to the priesthood is the exception rather than the rule for monastics, as a monastery will usually only have as many hieromonks and hierodeacons as it needs to perform the daily services.

In the church hierarchy, a hieromonk is of higher dignity than a hierodeacon, just as a secular (i.e., married) priest is of higher dignity than a deacon. Within their own ranks, hieromonks are assigned order of precedence according to the date of their ordination. Ranking above a hieromonk are a hegumen and an archimandrite.

Forms of address
The proper title for a hieromonk is, "the Reverend Hieromonk (religious name)". The form of address is, "Hieromonk (name)", "Father Hieromonk (name)", "Father (name)", or, informally, "Father". As with all Eastern Catholic and Orthodox monks, a hieromonk is not addressed by his family name, but only by his religious name. In writing, if it becomes necessary to use his family name—for instance, to distinguish him from another hieromonk with the same religious name—the family name should be placed in parentheses. Example: "Hieromonk John (Smith)". In cultures where a patronymic is customary, monks are never addressed by their patronymic, but only by their religious name.

In other countries and Western Christianity
In some countries, married clergy are referred to as "white clergy", while monastic clergy are called "black clergy" because monks should always wear black clothing but married clergy in many parts of the world typically wear white (or gray, blue or some other color) cassocks and rasons.

In Western Christianity, a priest who is also a monk is termed a "religious priest" or "regular clergy", i.e., living under a monastic rule (Latin: regula).

Notable people

Hieromonk Makarije (fl. 1494–1528), Serbian Orthodox, printer
Hieromonk Pahomije (fl. 1496–1544), Serbian Orthodox, printer
Hieromonk Mardarije (fl. 1552–66), Serbian Orthodox, printer
Mojsije Dečanac (fl. 1536–45), Serbian Orthodox, printer
Ilie Cătărău (1888– 1955), Romanian Orthodox, adventurer and spy
Seraphim Rose (1934–1982), American Russian Orthodox, translator

See also
Degrees of Eastern Orthodox monasticism
Archimandrite
Hegumen
Hierodeacon

References

Eastern Orthodox clergy
Ecclesiastical titles
Eastern Christian monasticism
Eastern Christian ecclesiastical offices